The NAIA Division II Football National Championship was a post-season playoff system featuring the best NAIA Division II college football teams in the United States. It was played annually between 1970 and 1996 when NAIA football play was divided into two divisions (similar to the present NCAA division structure); the NAIA Division I Football National Championship was played separately. It was typically held at the home field of the higher-seeded team. The championship was discontinued in 1997 after the two divisions were consolidated once again. The singular NAIA Football National Championship has been held every year since.

Westminster (PA) was the most successful team at the Division II level, winning the national title six times.

Results

Notes

Championships by school
Only includes titles won at the Division II level.

See also
NAIA Football Player of the Year Award
NAIA Football National Championship
NCAA Division I Football Championship
NCAA Division I FCS Consensus Mid-Major Football National Championship
NCAA Division II National Football Championship
NCAA Division III National Football Championship
NJCAA National Football Championship

References